In Indonesia, state-owned enterprises play an important role in the national economy. Their roles includes contributor for national economy growth, providing goods or services which are not covered by private company, employment provider, providing support guidance to small and medium businessess, and source of government revenue. The Ministry of State Owned Enterprises represents the government's function as a shareholder of those companies.

Aside from SOEs, there are also provincially- or municipally-owned corporations, locally known as Badan Usaha Milik Daerah (BUMD). The primary difference between BUMNs and BUMDs is the ownership of the enterprise, whereas BUMNs is controlled by Ministry of State Owned Enterprise while BUMDs is directly controlled by local government. BUMDs roles are similar with BUMNs, with heavy emphasis on providing goods or services to the local community. In addition, there are also village-owned enterprises which are run by village governments.

History

Dutch colonial era

During the Dutch colonial era, the government had a monopoly on the opium, pawnbroking (nationalized on 1 April 1901), posts (including the Post Office Savings Bank), telegraph and telephone industry, as well as owning most of the railways and electric utilities. They are managed by the Department of State-Owned Enterprises.

Post-independence

By the end of the Dutch–Indonesian Round Table Conference, the Indonesian government had a major or complete ownership on the public utility, buses, railways, banks and communications.

With the beginning of Guided Democracy in Indonesia, many Dutch-owned companies, or Indonesian branches of Dutch companies, were nationalized (see Nationalized Dutch companies below).

During the New Order, the nationalized companies were still state-owned. Some of the companies were listed in the Jakarta Stock Exchange later on.

Today the largest banks in Indonesia are mostly state-owned.

List of foreign companies nationalized during Guided Democracy

Bank Mandiri was a merger of:
Bank Ekspor Impor Indonesia (BankExim), formerly the Indonesian branch of Nederlandsche Handels Maatschappij which eventually becomes ABN AMRO
Bank Bumi Daya (formerly Bank Umum Negara), the result of the nationalizations of Nationale Handelsbank and the Chartered Bank of India, Australia and China (now Standard Chartered; the latter returning to Indonesia after the New Order went into power)
Bank Dagang Negara, formerly Escomptobank, also predecessor to ABN AMRO
Bank Pembangunan Indonesia (Bapindo), state-owned since establishment
Bank Rakyat Indonesia was known as
 1845: "Purwokertoan Assistance and Savings Bank for Native Aristocrats".
 1934-42: "General Public Credit Bank", 
 1942-45:  during Japanese occupation
 Bank Tabungan Negara was known as
 1897-42: "Post Office Savings Bank"
 1942-45: 
 1945-63: "Post Office Savings Bank"
Insurance industry:
NV Zee-en Brandassurantie Maatschappij van 1851, NV Zee-en Brandassurantie Maatschappij van 1861, NV Tweede Zee-en Brandassurantie Maatschappij van 1861, NV Zee-en Brandassuratie Maatschappij van 1865, NV Tweede Zee-en Brandassurantie Maatschappij van 1865, and NV Javasche Verszekerings Agenturen Maatschappij were consolidated into PN Asuransi Kerugian Eka Chandra (eventually merged into Jasindo, part of Indonesia Financial Group).
NV Assurantie Maatschappij Jakarta, NV Assurantie Kantoor Langeveldt-Schroder, NV Assurantie Kantoor O.W.J. Schlencker, NV Kantoor Asuransi Kali Besar, PT Maskapai Asuransi Arah Baru, Firma Blom & van der Aa, Firma Bekouw & Mynssen, and Firma Sluyters & Co were consolidated into PN Asuransi Kerugian Eka Karya and eventually merged into PT Jasa Raharja, part of Indonesia Financial Group).
NV Nederlandsche Lloyd and NV Maskapai Asuransi dan Administrasi Umum Nusantara Lloyd were consolidated into PN Asuransi Kerugian Eka Nusa and eventually merged into PT Asuransi Jasa Indonesia (Jasindo), part of Indonesia Financial Group.
NV Levensverzekering Maatschappy "Nilmij van 1859" (also known as the Indonesian branch of Nillmij, the parent of which later becomes Aegon N.V.), NV Levensverzekering Maatschappij van "De Nederlanden van 1845, Onderling Levensverzekering Genootschap "De Olveh van 1879", NV Eerste Nederlandsche Verzekering Maatschappij op het Leven en tegen Invaliditeit, NV  Amstleven (Amsterdamse Maatschappij van Levensverzekering), NV Nationale Levensverzekering Bank, Hollandsche Societeit van Levensverzekeringen, NV Levenverzekering Maatschappij "Ons Belang" (Levob), and NV Levensverzekering Maatschappij H.A.V. Bank were consolidated into PN Asuransi Jiwa Eka Sejahtera and eventually becomes PT Asuransi Jiwasraya (Persero).

Construction industry:
NV Architecten-Ingenieursbureau Fermont te Weltevreden en Ed. Cuypers te Amsterdam becomes PN Virama Karya. The company later turned into PT Virama Karya (Persero).
Indonesian Electrical and Mechanical Engineers and Contractors (INDEMEC) C.V. formerly Technisch Bureau H&S becomes PN Indra Karya. The company later turned into PT Indra Karya (Persero).
PT Biro Arsitek Job & Sprey/Architectenbureau Job en Sprey NV becomes PN Yodya Karya. The company later turned into PT Yodya Karya (Persero).
Nederlandse Aannemingsmaatschappij NV (now Ballast Nedam) becomes PN Nindya Karya. The company later turned into PT Nindya Karya (Persero) and is currently a subsidiary of PT Danareksa (Persero).
Aannemingsmaatschapij "De Kondor" NV (later IBB-Kondor and KondorWessels and now VolkerWessels) becomes PN Kumala Karya. The company was dissolved in 1971.
Hollandsche Beton Maatschappij (eventually acquired by Royal BAM Group) becomes PN Hutama Karya. The company later turned into PT Hutama Karya (Persero).
Royal Adriaan Volker Group (now VolkerWessels) trading as Volker Aannemingsmaatschappij NV in Indonesia, becomes PN Waskita Karya. The company later turned into PT Waskita Karya (Persero).
NV Pembangunan Perumahan becomes PN Pembangunan Perumahan and eventually turned into PT Pembangunan Perumahan (Persero)..
NV Technisch Handelmaatschappij Vis & Co. becomes PN Wijaya Karya. The company later turned into PT Wijaya Karya (Persero).
Architecten, Ingineurs en Aannemersbedrijf Associatie Selle en de Bruyn, Reyerse en de Vries NV becomes PN Adhi Karya. The company later turned into PT Adhi Karya (Persero).
Naamloze Vennootschap "Ingenieurs Bureau Ingenegeren-Vrijburg NV" becomes PN Indah Karya. The company later turned into PT Indah Karya (Persero).
NV Air Bersih
 Perusahaan Perdagangan Indonesia (Indonesia Trading Company) is a nationalized company from several trading companies such as N.V. Borneo Sumatra Maatschappij (Borsumij), Internationale Crediet- en Handelsvereeniging "Rotterdam" (Internatio, one of the predecessors of Imtech), Lindeteves, and Geo Wehry.
 PT Sang Hyang Seri from Pamanukan & Tjiasem Lands (since 1940, nationalized at 1957).
 PT Rajawali Nusantara Indonesia from Kian Gwan (nationalized at 1961).
 PT Garuda Indonesia
 1928-42: Royal Dutch Indies Airways
 1947-49: KLM Interinsulair Bedrijf
 Indonesian Railway Company
 1963-42: Nederlandsch-Indische Spoorweg Maatschappij
 1875-42: Staatsspoor-en-Tramwegen in Nederlandsch–Indië
 1945-58: Staatsspoorwegen Verenigde Spoorwegbedjrif (SS/VS) (fully nationalized at 1958)
 Pengangkutan Penumpang Djakarta
 1925–42,45-54 : Bataviache Verkeers Maatchappij (BVMNV)
 1942-45:

Types of SOEs
Since 2003, there are two types of state-owned enterprises (SOEs) in Indonesia:
 , are statutory public-benefit corporations with no shareholders. The main purpose of these SOEs is to provide goods and/or services to public. These firms are allowed to pursue profits. Perums, however, are increasingly rare as the government are converting many of them into perusahaan perseroan (see below), especially after the 1980s.
  are SOEs which are perseroan terbatas (PT) (i.e. a joint-stock company). This type of SOE is more independent than the Perums and the main goals of these firms are to gain profits and contribute to government revenue. This type of SOE is easy to recognize because they have the term Persero attached to their names. These SOEs, however, are subject to general perseroan terbatas laws, and similar to ordinary PTs its establishment and amendments to its articles of association, including increases to its capital, must be executed before a civil law notary with a notarial act, unlike Perums where its Articles of association (including amendments and capital increases) is directly legislated.There are two sub-type of Perusahaan Perseroan:
 Perusahaan Perseroan Terbuka (Persero Tbk.), or Public company, which are enterprises whose ownership belongs both to the government and to the general public which issue freely traded shares the stock exchange (or in over the counter markets). This subtype of SOEs also has the suffix Tbk. attached to their names.
 Perusahaan Perseroan Pemerintah which are enterprises whose ownership are 100% government-owned.

Until 2003, there was also another type of SOE called  which had operational costs funded from the national budget.  Employees of these SOEs were civil servants and the companies were regarded as government agencies. Firms in this category have been either upgraded into other types of SOEs or converted into government agencies.

List of companies 
Information on the state-owned enterprises (SOEs) is drawn from the Ministry of State Owned Enterprises and the Ministry of the State Secretariat's Legal Documentation and Information Network portals.

Indonesian SOEs subdivided into 12 clusters.

See also
 State owned enterprise

References

External links
 

 
Indonesia